John Lavers Bartram (3 June 1925 – 20 November 2014) was an Australian track and field athlete who competed at the 1948 Summer Olympics in the 100 metres, 400 metres and 4 × 100 metres relay.

Personal life
Bartram served in New Guinea as an able seaman in the Royal Australian Navy during the Second World War.

Competition record

References

John Bartram's obituary

1925 births
2014 deaths
People educated at Wesley College (Victoria)
Australian male sprinters
Olympic athletes of Australia
Athletes (track and field) at the 1948 Summer Olympics
Royal Australian Navy personnel of World War II
Royal Australian Navy sailors